Sonam Gyatso Mountaineering Institute (SGMI) is a paramilitary mountaineering school, located in Gangtok, India.

History 
In 1963, the Mountaineering Institute was established in Gangtok by Indian mountaineer Sonam Gyatso. After the demise of Gyatso in 1968, the institute was renamed Sonam Gyatso Mountaineering Institute. It is currently headed by former Intelligence Bureau (IB) officer Sonam Wangyal as its principal.

The institute is known for imparting high-altitude mountaineering training to Indian Army, IB, other paramilitary forces such as Indo-Tibetan Border Police and Assam Rifles. Also, it runs short-term courses for civilians.

List of expeditions 

 1979 Siniolchu expedition - 20 members from the institute climbed the peak.
1984 Mount Everest expedition - Institute's lead instructor Phu Dorjee became the first Indian to climb Everest without supplemental oxygen.
1991 Sanglaphu expedition - 11 members team from the institute made the first ascent.

Notable faculty 
 Sonam Gyatso
 Harish Chandra Singh Rawat
 Phu Dorjee
 Sonam Wangyal

Rankings 
 In 2016, Redbull included the institute in its list of top 10 mountaineering schools in India.

See also 

 Himalayan Mountaineering Institute
Mountaineering in India

References

Educational institutions established in 1963
Mountaineering in India
Educational organisations based in India
Education in Sikkim
Mountain warfare training installations
Mountaineering training institutes